Brian Carthy works as a Gaelic games correspondent and commentator for RTÉ, specialising in Gaelic games.

Early life and family
Carthy is a native of Ballymore, near Strokestown, County Roscommon. His mother was Susan.

In 2012, his son John Brian won an All-Ireland U-21 Football Championship medal playing in goal for Dublin against Brian's native Roscommon  and was part of the U-21 squad again in 2013.

Broadcasting career
Carthy's first day at RTÉ was 26 May 1980.

In 2011, Carthy was "downgraded" by RTÉ. This prompted a response from numerous Gaelic games figures, including Mickey Harte, Kieran McGeeney and Justin McNulty, who felt this mistreatment of Carthy was unfair. Those who disagreed with RTÉ's treatment of Carthy wrote a four-page letter to director general Noel Curran and boycotted the organisation.

Carthy launched a podcast in August 2022, focusing on Senior Club Championship results.

Writing career
In possession of a nationwide profile, Carthy has also written a number of books with a sporting theme.

References

External links
 Official biography at RTÉ Radio Sport

Year of birth missing (living people)
Living people
Gaelic games commentators
RTÉ controversies
RTÉ people